Rossville is a village in Ross Township, Vermilion County, Illinois, United States.  As of the 2020 census, the city population was 1,221. It is part of the Danville, Illinois Metropolitan Statistical Area.

History

The location was originally named Liggett's Grove in honor of John Liggett who built a lodging house in 1829.  Liggett's cabin was located on the Hubbard Trail, an early trading route established by Gurdon Hubbard from Chicago to Danville.  In 1833, this became the first state highway (now Illinois Route 1) and in 1914 was made part of the Dixie Highway.

In 1838, Alvan Gilbert purchased the Liggett farm, and the following year became postmaster at the newly established post office.  Rossville was incorporated as a village in August 1859.  Rossville and Ross Township were named after Jacob Ross, a settler in the area.

In February 2004, a fire broke out in the downtown business district and destroyed several of the historic buildings and antique shops for which Rossville has been known.

Geography

Demographics

As of the census of 2000, there were 1,317 people,532, and 341 families residing in the village. The racial makeup of the village was 97.78% White, 0.25% African American, 0.16% Native American, 0.08% Asian, 0.90% from other races, and 0.82% from two or more races. Hispanic or Latino of any race were 2.14% of the population.

There were 533 households, out of which 27.6% had children under the age of 18 living with them, 50.8% were married couples living together, 10.1% had a female householder with no husband present, and 36.0% were non-families. 32.3% of all households were made up of individuals, and 18.0% had someone living alone who was 65 years of age or older. The average household size was 2.28 and the average family size was 2.89.

In the village, the population was spread out, with 23.3% under the age of 18, 8.6% from 18 to 24, 25.2% from 25 to 44, 24.3% from 45 to 64, and 18.6% who were 65 years of age or older. The median age was 41 years. For every 100 females, there were 89.9 males. For every 100 females age 18 and over, there were 86.1 males.

The median income for a household in the village was $36,442, and the median income for a family was $43,882. Males had a median income of $32,083 versus $19,813 for females. The per capita income for the village was $16,794. About 7.8% of families and 9.8% of the population were below the poverty line, including 13.0% of those under age 18 and 8.8% of those age 65 or over.

Area attractions
Area attractions include the Rossville Historical Society Museum, the Rossville Railroad Depot Museum, Christman Park, and the Hubbard Trail Monument.  South of Rossville are Historic Mann's Chapel (1857) and an original State Road Mile Marker from 1833.

The Rossville Community Organization is active in hosting community events.  These include; Free A-Train week in September, Drivin' The Dixie Days in June, and Christmas in the Village on the first weekend in December.

Rossville has hosted an annual truck and tractor pull event nine
years running. Held in Christman Park, there are typically three divisions for
drivers to compete in including National Tractor Pull Association (NTPA),
Illiana Pullers Association (IPA) and Local Classes. NTPA classes are Grant
National Super Stock Tractors, Light Pro Stock Tractors, Super Farm Tractors
and Grand National Light Unlimited Modified Tractors. IPA include Pro Farm
Tractors, 2.6 Diesel Trucks, Farm Stock Tractors and N/A Tractors. The tractor
pull draws crowds and helps raise funds for FFA scholarships.

Transportation
Rossville is located at the intersection of Illinois Route 1 and County Road 14, about 7 miles south of Hoopeston and about 15 miles north of the county seat of Danville.  A railroad operated by CSX Transportation passes through the east side of town.

Notable people 

 Tom Merritt (1911-1991), Illinois state senator and politician, was born in Rossville.

References

External links

 Village of Rossville
 Danville Junction Chapter of National Railway Historical Society

Villages in Vermilion County, Illinois
Villages in Illinois
Populated places established in 1859
1859 establishments in Illinois